Aaron Michael Gray (born December 7, 1984) is an American former professional basketball player who played seven seasons in the National Basketball Association (NBA). A heart condition forced him into early retirement in 2015.

High school career
Gray played high school basketball at Emmaus High School in Emmaus, Pennsylvania. The school competes in Pennsylvania's highly competitive East Penn Conference. Gray did not start playing for the varsity team until the middle of his sophomore season. In Gray's senior season at Emmaus High School, he won the Pennsylvania Gatorade Player of the Year.

Gray was recruited by major collegiate basketball programs, including the Penn State, Pitt, and Rutgers, and committed to Pitt.

College career
While at Pitt, Gray was named a Third Team All-American after helping lead Pitt to the Sweet 16 in the 2007 NCAA Division I men's basketball tournament in March 2007.

Professional career
At the NBA's 2007 pre-draft camp, Gray was the only player whose height measured at least seven feet without shoes. He was selected with the 49th overall pick by the Chicago Bulls in the 2007 NBA draft.

Chicago Bulls (2007–2010)
Gray made his NBA debut with the Bulls on November 2, 2007 against the Philadelphia 76ers. On April 16, 2008 against the Toronto Raptors, he recorded 19 points, 22 rebounds and 2 assists in 35 minutes of play. In the 2007–08 season, Gray scored 262 points and recorded 168 rebounds for the Bulls.

New Orleans Hornets (2010–2011)
On January 25, 2010, the Bulls traded Gray to the New Orleans Hornets for Devin Brown.

On July 15, 2010, the Hornets re-signed Gray.

Toronto Raptors (2011–2013)
On December 11, 2011, Gray was signed to a one-year contract by the Toronto Raptors.

On July 27, 2012, Gray was re-signed by the Raptors.

On January 28, 2013, Gray recorded a career high 22 points, along with 10 rebounds, in a 114–102 loss to Golden State Warriors.

Sacramento Kings (2013–2014)
On December 9, 2013, the Raptors traded Gray, along with Rudy Gay and Quincy Acy, to the Sacramento Kings for Greivis Vásquez, Patrick Patterson, John Salmons, and Chuck Hayes.

On August 18, 2014, Gray signed with the Detroit Pistons. On September 29, 2014, the Pistons announced Gray would miss training camp while rehabbing from a cardiac episode suffered following a voluntary workout in late August. On October 26, 2014, he was waived by the Pistons.

Coaching career

Detroit Pistons (2015–2018) 
On June 19, 2015, Gray decided to retire after a blood clot was discovered in his heart in the summer of 2014. He subsequently joined Stan Van Gundy's staff at the Detroit Pistons as an assistant coach to work with the team's big men and with young prospects of the team's NBA D-League affiliate, the Grand Rapids Drive.

NBA career statistics

Regular season

|-
| align="left" | 
| align="left" | Chicago
| 61 || 1 || 10.0 || .505 || .000 || .566 || 2.8 || .7 || .3 || .3 || 4.3
|-
| align="left" | 
| align="left" | Chicago
| 56 || 18 || 12.8 || .485 || .000 || .576 || 3.9 || .8 || .3 || .3 || 3.5
|-
| align="left" | 
| align="left" | Chicago
| 8 || 0 || 6.3 || .381 || .000 || .286 || 2.0 || .3 || .0 || .0 || 2.3
|-
| align="left" | 
| align="left" | New Orleans
| 24 || 0 || 10.9 || .557 || .000 || .857 || 3.8 || .8 || .4 || .5 || 3.6
|-
| align="left" | 
| align="left" | New Orleans
| 41 || 6 || 13.0 || .566 || .000 || .500 || 4.2 || .4 || .3 || .3 || 3.1
|-
| align="left" | 
| align="left" | Toronto
| 49 || 40 || 16.6 || .516 || .000 || .532 || 5.7 || .6 || .4 || .3 || 3.9
|-
| align="left" | 
| align="left" | Toronto
| 42 || 16 || 12.2 || .533 || .000 || .523 || 3.2 || .8 || .2 || .1 || 2.8
|-
| align="left" | 
| align="left" | Toronto
| 4 || 0 || 5.0 || .667 || .000 || .500 || 2.0 || .8 || 0 || 0 || 1.3
|-
| align="left" | 
| align="left" | Sacramento
| 33 || 6 || 10.2 || .431 || .000 || .556 || 3.1 || .6 || .3 || .2 || 1.8
|- class="sortbottom"
| align="center" colspan="2"| Career
| 318 || 87 || 12.1 || .509 || .000 || .562 || 3.7 || .7 || .3 || .3 || 3.4

Playoffs

|-
| align="left" | 2009
| align="left" | Chicago
| 2 || 0 || 4.5 || .000 || .000 || .000 || .5 || .0 || .0 || .0 || .0
|-
| align="left" | 2011
| align="left" | New Orleans
| 6 || 0 || 14.5 || .692 || .000 || .375 || 3.5 || .3 || .3 || .3 || 3.5
|- class="sortbottom"
| align="center" colspan="2"| Career
| 8 || 0 || 12.0 || .600 || .000 || .375 || 2.8 || .3 || .3 || .3 || 2.6

References

External links

1984 births
Living people
All-American college men's basketball players
American expatriate basketball people in Canada
American men's basketball players
Basketball coaches from California
Basketball coaches from Pennsylvania
Basketball players from Los Angeles
Basketball players from Pennsylvania
Centers (basketball)
Chicago Bulls draft picks
Chicago Bulls players
Detroit Pistons assistant coaches
Emmaus High School alumni
New Orleans Hornets players
People from Tarzana, Los Angeles
Pittsburgh Panthers men's basketball players
Sacramento Kings players
Sportspeople from Lehigh County, Pennsylvania
Sportspeople from the New York metropolitan area
Toronto Raptors players